Uruguay competed at the 2016 Summer Olympics in Rio de Janeiro, Brazil from 5 to 21 August 2016. Since the nation's official debut in 1920, Uruguayan athletes have appeared in every edition of the Summer Olympic Games, with the exception of the 1980 Summer Olympics in Moscow, because of its partial support to the United States-led boycott.

The Uruguayan Olympic Committee confirmed a team of 17 athletes, 12 men and 5 women, to compete in eight sports at the Games. It was the nation's largest delegation sent to the Olympics since 1968, without any association to the team-based sports. There was only a single competitor in judo, rowing, tennis, weightlifting, and equestrian. 

Four athletes on the Uruguayan roster previously competed at London 2012, with two of them headed to their fourth Games: hurdler Andrés Silva and sailing legend Alejandro Foglia, who finished among the top eight in the Laser class before moving to Finn. Foglia was joined by his older sister Mariana, who sailed alongside her husband Pablo Defazio in the Nacra 17 category. Other notable Uruguayan athletes included marathon twins Martín and Nicolás Cuestas, world no. 40 tennis player Pablo Cuevas, and 17-year-old Laser Radial sailor Dolores Moreira, who was selected to carry the nation's flag at the opening ceremony.

Uruguay, however, did not win any Olympic medals in Rio de Janeiro. The nation's last medal happened at the 2000 Summer Olympics in Sydney, where track cyclist Milton Wynants bagged a silver in the points race (currently replaced by Omnium). Unable to end the nation's 16-year podium drought, long jumper Emiliano Lasa delivered the most successful outcome for the Uruguayans at the Games, placing sixth in the men's long jump final.

Athletics (track and field)
 
Uruguayan athletes have so far achieved qualifying standards in the following athletics events (up to a maximum of 3 athletes in each event):

Track & road events

Field events

Equestrian
 
Uruguay has entered one jumping rider into the Olympic jumping competition by virtue of a top six individual finish at the 2015 Pan American Games, signifying the nation's Olympic show jumping comeback for the first time in 56 years.

Jumping

Judo

Uruguay has qualified one judoka for the men's half-heavyweight category (100 kg) at the Games. Pablo Aprahamian earned a continental quota spot from the Pan American region, as Uruguay's top-ranked judoka outside of direct qualifying position in the IJF World Ranking List of May 30, 2016.

Rowing

Uruguay has qualified one boat in the men's single sculls at the 2016 Latin American Continental Qualification Regatta in Valparaiso, Chile.

Qualification Legend: FA=Final A (medal); FB=Final B (non-medal); FC=Final C (non-medal); FD=Final D (non-medal); FE=Final E (non-medal); FF=Final F (non-medal); SA/B=Semifinals A/B; SC/D=Semifinals C/D; SE/F=Semifinals E/F; QF=Quarterfinals; R=Repechage

Sailing
 
Uruguayan sailors have qualified one boat in each of the following classes through the individual fleet World Championships, and South American qualifying regattas.

M = Medal race; EL = Eliminated – did not advance into the medal race

Swimming

Uruguay has received a Universality invitation from FINA to send two swimmers (one male and one female) to the Olympics.

Tennis

Uruguay has entered one tennis player into the Olympic tournament, signifying the nation's comeback to the sport since 1996. Pablo Cuevas (world no. 40) qualified directly for the men's singles as one of the top 56 eligible players in the ATP World Rankings as of June 6, 2016.

Weightlifting

Uruguay has received an unused quota place from IWF to send a female weightlifter to the Olympics, signifying the nation's Olympic return to the sport for the first time since 1996.

See also
Uruguay at the 2015 Pan American Games
Uruguay at the 2016 Summer Paralympics

References

External links 

 

Nations at the 2016 Summer Olympics
2016
2016 in Uruguayan sport